Ivar Sollie Rønning (born 14 February 1993) is a Norwegian footballer who plays as a striker for Stjørdals-Blink.

Career
He signed a contract with Ranheim in 2019. He previously played for Levanger and HamKam. In January 2021, Rønning signed with KÍ Klaksvík of the Faroe Islands Premier League.

Rønning signed with OBOS-ligaen club Stjørdals-Blink on 27 January 2022, marking his return to Norwegian football.

Career statistics

References

1992 births
Living people
People from Levanger
Norwegian footballers
Levanger FK players
Hamarkameratene players
Ranheim Fotball players
KÍ Klaksvík players
Eliteserien players
Norwegian First Division players
Faroe Islands Premier League players
Association football forwards
Norwegian expatriate footballers
Expatriate footballers in the Faroe Islands
Norwegian expatriate sportspeople in the Faroe Islands
Sportspeople from Trøndelag